Louise Nimb (1842–1903) was a Danish chef and owner-manager of several restaurants in Copenhagen in the 19th century. Her cookbook, Fru Nimb's Kogebog (Mrs. Nimb's Cookbook), was published in 1888, one of several books published by her.

Early life
Louise Sophie Thora Nimb was born in Holstebro in Denmark on 9 October 1842. She was the youngest of nine children. Her father, Aron Abraham Gunst, was a Jewish merchant who had moved to Holstebro from Dresden in Germany. Her mother, Zerina Dellevie, had been born in Hamburg of Italian parents. She was both a skilled housewife and someone who helped her husband with his business. She also took an active part in the social life of Holstebro. Louise Nimb learned housekeeping and cooking from her mother and from the family maid. In 1852, the family moved to the Danish capital of Copenhagen, where Nimb went to school.

Marriage and work
At the age of 18, in 1861, she married Vilhelm Christopher Nimb. They had two daughters, Henriette and Zerina Emilie, and a son, who died shortly after birth. Together, the couple took over the running of an inn, called Nyholte Kro, which her father-in-law owned. The inn was well located to pick up business from stagecoaches, passing landowners and even royalty. Limb designed the inn so that it was cozy and comfortable, with a living room just for ladies. She improved her cooking skills by working with the inn's skilled and experienced cook. Unfortunately, the arrival of the railways made the business unviable, so they took over a restaurant in the Student Association (Studenterforeningen) in Copenhagen. They expanded their activities in 1868 with the restaurant Nytorv 3 and the restaurant in the Danish parliament. In 1877 they took over Divan 2 on the lake at Copenhagen's Tivoli Gardens, which came to be known as "Nimb's Terrace". In her hands the Divan 2 changed style and character, beginning to attract members of the upper class. As one journalist wrote, she "civilized the Copenhagen restaurant life". Her two daughters joined the work and were given increasing responsibility. Henriette was only 17 years old when she took over the management of a restaurant from her parents.

The Nimbs constantly expanded their business. In 1882 they took over a restaurant in the Industrial Association (Industriforeningen), management of which was later passed to their daughter, Zerina. In 1885, they opened a restaurant in the Panoptikon, a wax museum opened by the former director of the Tivoli, Bernhard Olsen, and soon after they took over a restaurant in the Erichsen Mansion, a building on Kongens Nytorv that had just been restored. Finally, they took over the restaurant in the Officers' Association and in 1896 in the Noble Club. Also, Nimb organized courses at her home for housewives. Despite their wide-ranging activities they never became rich and in 1880 were taking in a lodger, the Danish writer Herman Bang, who was to write beautifully about her on her death in 1903.

Written works

Fru Nimb's Kogebog (Mrs. Nimb's Cookbook), which was published in 1888, presented to the Danish public international, French-style cuisine for the first time in the Danish language. It included the classical repertoire of French dishes as well as German, English and Danish meals. The target group was the ladies of the private homes, as well as their cooks, who were given a handbook that enabled them to prepare large and small dinners. The cookbook was for dinner parties, but could also be used for everyday meals. In 1896, Nimb published a book on the use of vegetables for vegetarian dinners and also a book on jam making. In 1894, she published Karen, a didactic novel. Karen is young when she leaves school. She has to go out to serve as a maid, but she has never learned how to perform domestic chores. The novel aims to provide this knowledge. The book was named after the maid, Karen Jensen, from Nimb's childhood home. In 1899, she published a menu dictionary in French, English, German and Danish and the following year a small book with recipes for tomatoes, the first in Denmark. She often sought advice from the leading researchers of the time. Thus, she collaborated with a horticultural theorist about the jam book and with a doctor about Cookbook and Menus for Diabetic Patients, published in 1900. Nimb, herself, had diabetes.

Legacy

Nimb's daughters continued the restaurant business, but her cookbook, which ran to three editions during her lifetime, slowly went out of vogue (it was republished in 1996). Her daughters opened the Fru Nimb restaurant in the Tivoli gardens in 1909. In 1930 the Danish National Broadcasting Company made Nimb famous across the country with live broadcasts of contemporary dance music. Three restaurants and two bars continued to bear the Nimb name in 2022. The name also lives on in the Nimb Hotel, an upmarket, suite-only, hotel that is also in the Tivoli Gardens.

Death
Nimb died in Copenhagen on 3 May 1903. Her remains are buried in the same plot as her husband and two daughters.

References 

1842 births
1903 deaths
People from Holstebro
19th-century Danish women writers
19th-century Danish businesswomen
Danish chefs
Danish women chefs
Danish cookbook writers
Danish restaurateurs